Eckley Brinton Coxe (June 4, 1839 – May 13, 1895) was an American mining engineer, coal baron, state senator and philanthropist from Pennsylvania.  He was a co-founder of the Coxe Brothers and Company coal mining operation which became the largest individual producer of anthracite coal in the United States at the time.

He was instrumental in the formation of Lehigh University as a mining school in 1865 and founded the Institute of Miners and Mechanics in 1879.  He served as president of the American Institute of Mining Engineers from 1878 to 1880 and of the American Society of Mechanical Engineers from 1893 to 1894.

He served as a Democratic member of the Pennsylvania State Senate for the 21st district from 1881 to 1884.

Early life and education
Coxe was born June 4, 1839, in Philadelphia, Pennsylvania to Charles Sidney Coxe (1791–1879) and Anna Maria Brinton (1801–1876). His great-great grandfather was Daniel Coxe, his grandfather was Tench Coxe and his cousin was George B. McClellan.

Coxe graduated from the University of Pennsylvania in 1858 with degrees in Chemistry and Physics.  He spent six months after graduation in the Lehigh Valley region of Pennsylvania conducting a topographical geology survey of his grandfather's 35,000 acre estate under the supervision of Benjamin Smith Lyman.

In 1860 he traveled to Europe and studied for 2 years at the Ecole des mines in Paris, France and for 1 year at Freiberg Mining Academy in Freiberg, Saxony.  He spent an additional 2 years studying the mines in England and continental Europe and returned to the United States in 1864.

He served during the U.S. Civil War on the staff of Major General George Meade.

Career
Eckley Coxe's grandfather, Tench Coxe, had purchased 800,000 acres of land in Pennsylvania and urged his heirs to hold on to the land as he suspected coal would be found in the region.  Tench's son, Charles, was able to retain ownership of 35,000 acres and left it to his sons including Eckley.

Coal was found in the Coxe owned land and the Coxe Brothers and Company mining company was founded in 1865 with the first mine opened in Drifton, Pennsylvania. By the late 1800s, the company was the largest independent producer of anthracite coal  with nearly 4,000 employees, coal shipments in excess of 1.5 million tons and land assets valued at $10 million.

The Coxe Brothers & Company organization became the Cross Creek Coal Company led by Coxe, and in 1890 Coxe organized and became president of the Delaware, Susquehanna and Schuylkill Railroad.

In 1869, Coxe married Sophia Georgina Fisher.  Together they worked to improve the lives of miners by building a fully functional hospital at the mines to help miners injured on the job.

He lectured frequently before scientific bodies.  He published several technical papers on mining and translated the first volume of Julius Weisbach's "Mechanics of Engineering and Construction of Machines" from German to English in 1872.

He was instrumental in the founding of Lehigh University in Bethlehem, Pennsylvania as a mining school in 1865 and served on its board of trustees until his death.  In 1877, his mines were selected by the Columbia College School of Mines for their study program due to the quality of the mines.  He founded the Institute for Miners and Mechanics in 1879 in Freeland, Pennsylvania.  The intent of the school was to teach math, science and English to the men working in the mines.

He was strongly anti-union and defeated two powerful unions in one of the longest strikes in the coal industry from September 1887 to March 1888.

He was a member of the American Society of Civil Engineers.  He was elected as a member in 1870 to the American Philosophical Society. In 1880 Coxe was one of the original founders of the American Society of Mechanical Engineers.  He served as the president of the American Institute of Mining Engineers from May 1878 to February 1880 and as vice president of the Institute of Mechanical Engineers from April 1880 to November 1881.

Coxe was an inventor who was granted over 100 patents.  He developed a long steel tape for the measurement of land by surveyors and the traveling grate, which he patented in 1893.

He served as a Democratic member of the Pennsylvania State Senate for the 21st district from 1881 to 1884.  He served as chairman of the Pennsylvania delegation to the Democratic National Convention in Chicago in 1884.

He died on May 13, 1895, of pneumonia and was interred at Saint James Episcopal Churchyard in Drifton, Pennsylvania.

Legacy
Eckley Miners' Village in Pennsylvania was named for him in 1857 by his father.

The Coxe Hall (1910) at Lehigh University, originally a mining laboratory, is named after him.

Coxe was admitted to the National Inventors Hall of Fame in 2006 for his work on the traveling-grate furnace.

Publications 
 Eckley B. Coxe. "A Furnace with Automatic Stoker, Travelling Grate and Variable Blast, Intended Especially for Burning Small Anthracite Coals." Transactions of the American Institute of Mining. 1895.
"Mechanics of Engineering: Theoretical Mechanics, with an Introduction to the Calculus", D. Van Nostrand Company, New York, 1889.

References

External links 
 Coxe, Eckley - Lehigh University

1839 births
1895 deaths
19th-century American businesspeople
19th-century American engineers
19th-century American inventors
19th-century American politicians
19th-century American philanthropists
American company founders
American mechanical engineers
American mining engineers
American patent holders
Burials in Pennsylvania
Deaths from pneumonia in Pennsylvania
Engineers from Pennsylvania
Founders of schools in the United States
Lehigh University people
Members of the American Philosophical Society
Mines Paris - PSL alumni
Politicians from Philadelphia
Democratic Party Pennsylvania state senators
Philanthropists from Pennsylvania
People from Luzerne County, Pennsylvania
People of Pennsylvania in the American Civil War
Presidents of the American Society of Mechanical Engineers
University of Pennsylvania alumni